Meadow Lake is a city in the boreal forest of northwestern Saskatchewan, Canada. Founded as a trading post in 1799, it became a village in 1931 and a town in 1936. On November 9, 2009, it officially became Saskatchewan's 14th city.

Meadow Lake is the main business centre of northwestern Saskatchewan and serves the many towns and villages as a regional shopping centre. It is the second-largest community in Saskatchewan's Census Division No. 17, after Saskatchewan's portion of the interprovincial city of Lloydminster. The city is on the western shore of Meadow Lake and borders the Rural Municipality of Meadow Lake No. 588 and the Flying Dust First Nation No. 105 reserves.

History

Peter Fidler built Bolsover House in 1799 near "Lac des Prairies", the first name given to Meadow Lake. In 1873 Métis families arrived establishing a Hudson's Bay Company trading post, joined by other settlers in the early 1900s. The largest impetus occurred following a fire of 1919 and the exodus of some of the settlers during the Great Depression from the Dust Bowl of central and southern Saskatchewan to communities in the north.

Bolsover House
Peter Fidler of the Hudson's Bay Company was told by Indian guides that Meadow Lake was a good place for furs. On August 30, 1799 he reached the mouth of the Meadow Lake River. The stream was so narrow and crooked that he almost despaired of navigating it. When he reached the lake he found it so shallow and swampy that he had to proceed demi-chargé. Finding no good place on the lake he went up a river and selected a place about 1,000 yards inland to build the 12 foot by 12 foot log fort. He named it Bolsover House after his hometown in England. The post returned only 190 made beaver in the first season so in 1801 it was closed and everything moved east to Green Lake House. The exact site of Bolsover House is unknown. There is a monument to Peter Fidler in Meadow Lake at Elk's Park.

Demographics 

The Meadow Lake Indian Band was established in 1889 with signing of Treaty 6 to the north of Meadow Lake. This reserve is now named the Flying Dust First Nation.

Geography
Meadow Lake is located in the middle of an area pre-historically covered by a large glacial lake also called Meadow Lake formed from a receding continental glacier, of which only a fraction still exists. The lake is located on the east side of the city. The ancient lakeshore forms the Meadow Lake Escarpment, a significant terrain feature clearly visible looking south from many points in the city.

The area is a part of the Southern Boreal EcoRegion with the Northern Boreal EcoRegion to the north and the Parkland EcoRegion on the south. The neighbouring rural areas include Trembling aspen Populus tremuloides, White spruce Picea glauca, Jack Pine Pinus banksiana, Black Spruce Picea mariana and muskegs

Specifically Meadow Lake is situated in the Meadow Lake plain of the Boreal transition ecoregion in the Boreal Plain ecozone.

Climate
Meadow Lake experiences a subarctic climate (Köppen climate classification Dfc) that falls just short of being classified as a Humid continental climate (Köppen Dfb). A record snowfall depth was recorded February 22, 1997, when  was measured. The humidex was set at a high of 40.4 on August 10, 1991, and the opposite extreme was felt with a −55.8 windchill on December 20, 1989.

Government
Meadow Lake has a mayor as the highest ranking government official. Voters also elect aldermen or councillors to form the municipal council. Currently the mayor is Merlin Seymour.

Provincially, Meadow Lake is within the Meadow Lake constituency. It is currently represented served by their MLA, Jeremy Harrison of the Saskatchewan Party.

Meadow Lake is represented in the House of Commons of Canada by its MP of the Desnethé—Missinippi—Churchill River riding, currently Gary Vidal of the Conservative Party of Canada.

Economy
The tourism, fishing, fur, pulpwood, forestry, agricultural grains, livestock, dairy and poultry product industries all support Meadow Lake which boasted seven grain elevators in 1955. Meadow Lake was processing three million bushels of grain in 1953, the highest amount for a single Canadian community.

Currently the city's heavy industry is dominated by the primary forestry industry and related service companies, including trucking and forestry management companies. The forest companies include NorSask Forest Products Inc., Meadow Lake Mechanical Pulp Ltd. and the Meadow Lake OSB Limited Partnership. Support industries include Mistik Management and various privately held trucking companies.

Meadow Lake acts as a business hub in its local area, providing services for the smaller surrounding communities of Dorintosh and Rapid View and surrounding reserves including the Flying Dust First Nation and the Eagles Lake reserve.

A major component of the Meadow Lake economy is the First Nation communities and their relative success. The Flying Dust First Nation, which directly borders the town, owns and operates many of the city's most profitable industries, including direct ownership of NorSask Forest Products Inc., a portion of the Meadow Lake OSB Partnership, stakes in local trucking and service companies, and a sizeable farming operation which is currently limited to leasing the vast amounts of local property they own or have title on.

The community's agricultural community is also sizeable, including both cereal production and ranching operations. The most pristine agricultural lands are closest to the city, whereas the surrounding areas become less suitable for farming and more amenable to ranching towards the north with the Canadian Shield, or east to the St. Cyr Hills. The city boasts one stockyard and two major agricultural equipment dealers.

The community is home to the SaskPower Meadow Lake Power Station.

Education
Meadow Lake is served by Transition Place Education Centre, Carpenter High, Jonas Samson Junior High, Lakeview elementary, Jubilee Elementary, Gateway Elementary, and North West Regional College, which offers courses at both the college and university levels. University courses, including complete, community-based Bachelor of Education and Master of Education programs are offered by the University of Regina.

In the spring of 2005, the Government of Saskatchewan invested CA$41,000 to upgrade the roof at Jonas Samson Junior High School. Academy of Learning AOL is a post secondary career and business college in Meadow Lake.
For the school year 2007–2008, Lakeview Elementary School started a much anticipated French Immersion Program.
Historically the Meadow Lake area was served by several one-room schoolhouses, the closest being the Meadow Lake School District #1201 Township 59, range 17, west of the 3rd Meridian.

Local media

Newspapers
The Northern Pride is a weekly newspaper based in Meadow Lake and serves northwestern Saskatchewan. The Meadow Lake Progress was a local newspaper that was published from 1931 to 2013.

Radio
CJNS-FM 102.3 and CFDM-FM 105.7 are the local radio stations.  The town is also served by CBKM-FM 98.5, a repeater of CBK-AM 540 in Watrous.

Transportation
Meadow Lake is located on SK Highway 55, and SK Highway 4. The Prince Albert - Leoville - Meadow Lake - North Battleford Canadian Pacific Railway reached Meadow Lake Station at Section 26, Township 59, Range 17, west of the Third Meridian in 1931.

Attractions
Meadow Lake's Tourist Information Centre is located on Highway 4 South in the Meadow Lake Lions Park. The building is shared by the Meadow Lake Museum Society, Northern Saskatchewan Tourism, and the Meadow Lake Chamber of Commerce.

Meadow Lake Provincial Park, located about 40 km to the north, takes its name from the city. Other nearby parks include Meadow Lake Lions Park, Nesset Lake Recreation Site, and Saint Cyr Hills Trails Recreation Site.

Meadow Lake Golf Club is an 18-hole golf course on the south side of the city of Meadow Lake, along Highway 4. Meadow Lake is directly east of the golf course. The golf course was built in 1952 and is a par 72 with a total of 6432 yards. The course also features a 20-tee driving range.

Notable people
Notable persons who were born, grew up, or established their fame in Meadow Lake:
 William Bleasdell Cameron (1862–1951), survivor of the Frog Lake Massacre, author, journalist
 Blake Comeau - 2006 World Junior Ice Hockey Championships gold medallist, NHL hockey player with the Dallas Stars
 Jeff Friesen - former NHL hockey player, Stanley Cup Champion (2003)
 Joe Handley - former Premier of The Northwest Territories
 Jeremy Harrison - current MLA
 Dakota Ray Hebert - actress and comedian
 D. J. King - former NHL hockey player
 Dwight King - former NHL and current KHL hockey player, He was a member of the Kings' Stanley Cup championship teams in 2012 and in 2014.
 John Klebuc - Chief Justice of The Saskatchewan Court of Appeal
 Merlin Malinowski - former NHL hockey player
 George McLeod - former Saskatchewan Cabinet Minister and Deputy Premier
 Jon Mirasty - AHL hockey player
 Mike Siklenka - AHL hockey player
 Maynard Sonntag - former Saskatchewan Cabinet Minister
 Jeremy Yablonski - NHL and AHL hockey player

Gallery

See also
List of communities in Saskatchewan
List of cities in Saskatchewan
List of Hudson's Bay Company trading posts

References

Book reference

External links

 
1931 establishments in Saskatchewan
Cities in Saskatchewan